Qualifications for Boy's artistic gymnastic competitions at the 2010 Summer Youth Olympics was held at the Bishan Sports Hall on August 16, 2010. The results of the qualification determined the qualifiers to the finals: 18 gymnasts in the all-around final, and 8 gymnasts in each of 6 apparatus finals.  For the vault, the athlete must perform two vaults though only the first only is counted towards the score, also not everyone participated in a second jump.

Qualification results

References
 Results

Gymnastics at the 2010 Summer Youth Olympics